The Yamuna Sports Complex is a sports complex located in New Delhi, India. Inaugurated in 1999, it has wide spectrum of sporting facilities. It is owned by the Delhi Development Authority. It was one of the multiple venues for the 2010 Commonwealth Games

Overview
The table tennis venue has a capacity of 4,297. It has two show court tables, eight match tables and 10 warm-up tables . The total area of the plot is 26,0000 square metres. Basement area is 26,000 square metres and the total plinth area is 43,765 square metres. It has wooden flooring in match courts and show courts. It has car parking facilities for 504 cars.
The archery venue has a capacity of 1,500. The total area of the plot is 40,000 square metres. It has car parking facilities for 500 cars. It is located near the posh locality of Yojana Vihar, near Vivek Vihar and Shahdara localities. 
The nearest metro station to the sports complex is Karkardooma Metro station with a distance of about 2 km. Yamuna sports complex has state of the art Gymnasium facilities, clay & synthetic tennis courts and cricket ground. It also has astroturf hockey ground facility.
A large stone sculpture "Aiming For Excellence" by noted sculptor, Amarnath Sehgal, was installed at the complex in January 2002. 
It was the venue for Archery at the 2010 Commonwealth Games as well as Lawn bowls at the 2010 Commonwealth Games

See also
2010 Commonwealth Games
Jawaharlal Nehru Stadium, Delhi

References

External links
 Sports Complex  at wikimapia
 Yamuna Sports Complex, webpage at Delhi Development Authority

2010 Commonwealth Games venues
Sports venues in Delhi
Indoor arenas in India
East Delhi district
Table tennis in India
Table tennis venues
Sports venues completed in 1999
Archery venues
Bowls in India
Swimming venues in India
1999 establishments in Delhi
Lawn bowls at the Commonwealth Games
Archery at the Commonwealth Games
20th-century architecture in India